is a Japanese Grand Prix motorcycle racer, competing in Moto3 for Liqui Moly Husqvarna Intact GP.

Career

Junior career
In 2015 Sasaki was the Asia Talent Cup champion and also competed in the 2015 Red Bull MotoGP Rookies Cup, winning a race in Silverstone, and finishing in 2nd twice, and 3rd twice, finishing the season third in the standings.

In the 2016 Red Bull MotoGP Rookies Cup, Sasaki won four races, finished on the podium eleven times during the thirteen races, and never finished outside the top four, winning the title by 49 points.

Moto3 World Championship

Gresini Racing Moto3 (2016)
In the 2016 Moto3 World Championship, he made his Grand Prix debut with the Gresini Racing team at the Malaysian Grand Prix as the replacement rider for the injured Enea Bastianini.

SIC Racing Team (2017)
He was signed up to race in the 2017 Moto3 World Championship for Sepang Racing Team, partnering Adam Norrodin. Sasaki had an impressive rookie campaign, finishing in the points eight times, twice in the top ten (8th place in Mugello, and 7th at Phillip Island), and ended up winning rookie of the year, scoring 32 points, finishing 20th in the standings.

Petronas Sprinta Racing (2018–2019)
Staying with Sepang SIC Racing Team for the 2018 Moto3 World Championship, Sasaki basically copied his 2017 campaign: he finished in the points eight times, his two best finishes were a 7th place in Austria, and an 8th place in Qatar, and finished the season 20th in the standings, with 50 points.

For the 2019 Moto3 World Championship, Sasaki would stay with Petronas Sepang Racing Team, but would be partnered by John McPhee. Sasaki improved, with five top-ten finishes (5th in Argentina, 6th in Britain, 7th in Australia, 8th in Barcelona, and 9th in Germany), 11 point scoring finishes, a Pole position at the Sachsenring, finishing the season with 62 points, and 20th in the standings.

Red Bull KTM Tech3 (2020–2021)
Sasaki switched teams for the 2020 Moto3 World Championship, signing with Red Bull KTM Tech3, to partner Deniz Öncü. Sasaki and Öncü were very evenly matched during the year, Sasaki collecting 52 points, and Öncü 50. Sasaki finished in the points eight times, in the top-10 three times, and scored his first career Moto3 podium at Aragón, seeing the checkered flag in 2nd place, just 0.051 seconds behind Jaume Masiá.

Tech3 kept both Öncü and Sasaki for the 2021 season, and both riders improved. Sasaki especially started the season well, with a 7th place in Doha, a 4th place in Portimao, a 5th place in Jerez, a 5th place in Le Mans, and a 5th place in Mugello. On 29 May 2021 in the 2021 Italian motorcycle Grand Prix, Sasaki was involved in an accident with Jason Dupasquier and Jeremy Alcoba, and unfortunately Dupasquier succumbed to his injuries the following day. Following the accident, Sasaki did not participate in the following two races. He returned for Austria, finishing in 5th place, before scoring his only podium of the season in Aragón, finishing 3rd, with Öncü finishing 2nd. He scored 120 points during the year, finishing 9th in the championship standings.

Sterilgarda Huqvarna Max (2022)
For 2022, Sasaki is contracted to race for Sterilgarda Husqvarna Max team, along with 2019 teammate John McPhee.

Liqui Moly Husqvarna Intact GP (2023)
In 2023 Moto3 World Championship, he riding for Liqui Moly Husqvarna Intact GP.

Career statistics

Asia Talent Cup

Races by year
(key) (Races in bold indicate pole position; races in italics indicate fastest lap)

Red Bull MotoGP Rookies Cup

Races by year
(key) (Races in bold indicate pole position, races in italics indicate fastest lap)

FIM CEV Moto3 Junior World Championship

Races by year
(key) (Races in bold indicate pole position, races in italics indicate fastest lap)

Grand Prix motorcycle racing

By season

By class

Races by year
(key) (Races in bold indicate pole position, races in italics indicate fastest lap)

References

External links

Profile on redbullrookiescup.com

2000 births
Living people
Japanese motorcycle racers
Moto3 World Championship riders
People from Yokosuka, Kanagawa